Santiago Luna Torres (born 29 November 1962) is a Spanish professional golfer.

Luna's father was on the staff at Puerta de Hierro Golf Club in Madrid. He turned professional in 1982 and has spent over twenty years on the European Tour, playing in over five hundred tournaments. He ranked in the top one hundred on the Order of Merit twelve times, with a best of 31st place in 1998. His sole win on the European Tour came in 1995 at the Madeira Island Open, but he has several victories in other professional tournaments. He has represented his country in international competition several times, and in 1999 he helped Spain to the runner-up position at the World Cup.

Professional wins (16)

European Tour wins (1)

Alps Tour wins (2)

Other wins (9)
1988 Les Bulles Laurent-Perrier (France), Spanish Professional Closed Championship
1990 Spanish Professional Closed Championship
1992 Spanish Professional Closed Championship
1998 King Hassan II Trophy
1999 Oki Telepizza - APG (Spain)
2000 Spanish Professional Closed Championship
2002 King Hassan II Trophy
2003 King Hassan II Trophy

European Senior Tour wins (4)

Playoff record
Challenge Tour playoff record (0–1)

Results in major championships

Note: The Open Championship was the only major Luna played.

CUT = missed the halfway cut
"T" indicates a tie for a place.

Team appearances
Professional
Alfred Dunhill Cup (representing Spain): 1991, 1998
World Cup (representing Spain): 1995, 1998, 1999

See also
2005 European Tour Qualifying School graduates
2006 European Tour Qualifying School graduates
2008 European Tour Qualifying School graduates

References

External links

Spanish male golfers
European Tour golfers
European Senior Tour golfers
Golfers from Madrid
1962 births
Living people
20th-century Spanish people
21st-century Spanish people